The Honda Fit Shuttle is a subcompact station wagon derived from the Fit and is mainly available in Japan's domestic market. The Shuttle is also a successor to the station wagon variant of first generation Fit, sold as the Airwave.



First generation (GG7/8/GP2; 2011–2015)

The launch of the car in June 2011 was pushed back from March as a result of the earthquake and tsunami in Japan on March 11, 2011. Production of the car was transferred from Honda's Sayama plant in Saitama Prefecture to Suzuka plant in Mie Prefecture as a result of power rationing after the quake. Production began in early May 2011. The Fit Shuttle was shortlisted for Car of The Year Japan 2012.

Its drivetrains are shared with the Fit. A hybrid version, the Fit Shuttle Hybrid, is also available, with a 1.3 L i-VTEC engine with IMA. Continuously variable transmission is the only transmission available for FWD models. A five-speed automatic transmission is standard on four-wheel-drive models.

The fuel efficiency of the station wagon and its hybrid variant was enhanced to be the same as that of Fit and Fit hybrid by reducing engine friction, front brake rolling resistance, improvement in aerodynamics and improvement of control efficiency of the hybrid system. All models feature ECON Mode for enhancing real-world fuel economy. Hybrid model has Eco Assist (Ecological Drive Assist System) to help the driver engage in fuel-efficient driving practices. It went on sale on June 16, 2011, in Japan.

The Fit Shuttle comes with a double-hinged two-piece load floor that both allows access to an under-floor storage bin and also functions as a divider for the cargo area. Through better sound dampening and insulation, the Fit Shuttle is pledged to be as quiet as a mid-size sedan.

Second generation (GK8/9/GP7/8; 2015–2022)

The second generation model was sold and renamed as the Honda Shuttle, unlike the previous generation model and is still similarly based with the Honda Fit. Honda had begun sales of the all-new Shuttle at dealerships across Japan on May 15, 2015, with the compact wagon starting from 1,990,000 yen.

The Honda Shuttle is available with either an  1.5-liter direct-injection DOHC i-VTEC gasoline engine mated to a CVT or a hybrid version equipped with the Sport Hybrid i-DCD system.

It is available in G, Hybrid base, Hybrid X and Hybrid Z trim levels with Honda Sensing as standard.

Honda says the Shuttle Hybrid averages  according to the JC08 standard. For the first time, the Shuttle is also offered with a four-wheel drive option. 

It received a facelift on May 10, 2019, featuring redesigned bumpers and revised rear tail lamps that stretches towards the centre of the tailgate.

Production of the Shuttle ended in August 2022, and it was discontinued on November 10, 2022.

See also
Honda EV Plus
Honda L-series engine

References

External links

Honda Shuttle global site

2010s cars
All-wheel-drive vehicles
Cars introduced in 2011
Front-wheel-drive vehicles
Fit
Hybrid electric cars
Station wagons
Subcompact cars
Vehicles with CVT transmission